Gralewo may refer to the following places:
Gralewo, Greater Poland Voivodeship (west-central Poland)
Gralewo, Lubusz Voivodeship (west Poland)
Gralewo, Warmian-Masurian Voivodeship (north Poland)